Bostancı Bağcıl Spor Kulübü is a Northern Cypriot football club based in Zodeia, Morphou/Omorfo.

Colors
The club colors are white and green.

Stadium
The club's home stadium is Bostancı Yakup Ozorun Stadı.

References 

Football clubs in Northern Cyprus